Miren is an urbanized settlement in the Municipality of Miren-Kostanjevica in the Littoral region of Slovenia right next to the border with Italy. The hill known as Miren Castle rises above the settlement to the south.

Name
The settlement was attested in written sources in 1494 as Merinach an der Wippach, and in 1523 as Japinitz oder Merina. The name is believed to have arisen through ellipsis of a noun phrase (e.g., *miren grad 'walled castle'), leaving the adjective *miren 'walled' (< *myrьnъ). If so, the name refers to the walls of Miren Castle above the settlement. A less likely theory derives the name from *Marijin 'Mary's', referring to the pilgrimage church above the settlement.

Church
The parish church in the settlement is dedicated to Saint George and belongs to the Diocese of Koper. It was built between 1827 and 1828.

Notable people
Notable people that were born or lived in Miren include:
Leopold Kemperle (1886–1950), journalist
Oskar Kogoj (born 1942), industrial designer
 (1908–1943), poet, pastoral worker
Krištof Spollad (1777–1858), priest
Marko Vuk (1947–2004), art historian
 (1912–1912), poet, writer

References

External links

Miren on Geopedia

Populated places in the Municipality of Miren-Kostanjevica